Joon-hee, also spelled Jun-hee, is a Korean unisex given name. Its meaning differs based on the hanja used to write each syllable of the name. There are 34 hanja with the reading "joon" and 24 hanja with the reading "hee" on the South Korean government's official list of hanja which may be registered for use in given names.

People with this name include:
Lim Jun-hee (born 1959), South Korean female composer
Jun Choi (full name Jun-Hee Choi, born 1971), American male politician of Korean descent
Joseph Kahn (born Ahn Jun-hee, 1972), South Korean-born American male director
Han Jun-hee (born 1985), South Korean male director
Go Joon-hee (born Kim Eun-ju, 1986), South Korean actress
Lee Joon-hee (born 1988), South Korean male football player
Choi Jun-hee (born 1993), stage name Juniel, South Korean female singer-songwriter
Jun Hee Lee, American actor of Korean descent

Fictional characters with this name include:
Go Joon-hee, in 2005 South Korean television series Fashion 70's
Go Joon-hee, in 2006 South Korean television series What's Up Fox
Lee Joon-hee, in 2009 South Korean television series Cinderella Man
Gu Jun-hee, in 2009 South Korean television series Boys Over Flowers 
Kang Joon-hee, in 2012 South Korean television series Reply 1997

See also
List of Korean given names

References

Korean unisex given names